Frattini is an Italian surname. Notable people with the surname include:

 Angelo Frattini, sculptor
 Franco Frattini, politician
 Giovanni Frattini, mathematician
 Frattini argument
 Frattini subgroup
 Francesco Frattini, cyclist

Italian-language surnames